A Peep Behind the Scenes is a British novel by O.F. Walton, first published in 1877. It portrays the life of a travelling fair and in particular Rosalie, a girl who works as part of a theatre troupe under her domineering father. It was Walton's best-known work.

Film adaptations
The novel was twice turned into silent films. In 1918 Kenelm Foss directed A Peep Behind the Scenes starring Ivy Close and Gerald Ames. In 1929 Jack Raymond made a further version.

References

Bibliography
 Low, Rachael. History of the British Film, 1918-1929. George Allen & Unwin, 1971.

1877 British novels
Novels set in England
Novels by O.F. Walton
British novels adapted into films
Circus books